The Japanese term , from Portuguese cristão (cf. Kristang), meaning "Christian", referred to Catholic Christians in Japanese and is used in Japanese texts as a historiographic term for Catholics in Japan in the 16th and 17th centuries.

Modern Japanese has several words for "Christian", of which the most common are the noun form  キリスト教徒, and also  クリスチャン. The Japanese word  キリシタン is used primarily in Japanese texts for the early history of Roman Catholicism in Japan, or in relation to Kakure Kirishitan, hidden Christians. However, English sources on histories of Japan generally use the term "Christian" without distinction.

Both the transcriptions 切支丹 and 鬼利死丹 came into use during the Edo Period when Christianity was a forbidden religion. 

Portuguese ships began arriving in Japan in 1543, with Catholic missionary activities in Japan beginning in earnest around 1549, mainly by Portuguese-sponsored Jesuits until Spanish-sponsored mendicant orders, such as the Franciscans and Dominicans, gained access to Japan. Of the 95 Jesuits who worked in Japan up to 1600, 57 were Portuguese, 20 were Spaniards and 18 Italian. Francis Xavier, Cosme de Torres (a Jesuit priest), and João Fernandes were the first to arrive to Kagoshima with hopes to bring Christianity and Catholicism to Japan. At its height, Japan is estimated to have had around 300,000 Christians. Catholicism was subsequently repressed in several parts of the country and ceased to exist publicly in the 17th century.

History

Background

Line of demarcations between Portugal and Spain 

Religion was an integral part of the state and evangelization was seen as having both secular and spiritual benefits for both Portugal and Spain. Indeed, Pope Alexander VI's Bulls of Donation (1493) commanded the Catholic Monarchs to take such steps. Wherever Spain and Portugal attempted to expand their territories or influence, missionaries would soon follow. By the Treaty of Tordesillas (1494), the two powers divided the world between them into exclusive spheres of influence, trade and colonization.  Although, at the time of the demarcation, neither nation had any direct contact with Japan, that nation fell into the sphere of the Portuguese.

The countries disputed the allocation of Japan. Since neither could colonize it, the exclusive right to propagate Christianity in Japan meant the exclusive right to trade with Japan. Portuguese-sponsored Jesuits under Alessandro Valignano took the lead in proselytizing in Japan over the objection of the Spaniards, starting in 1579. The fait accompli was approved in Pope Gregory XIII's papal bull of 1575, which decided that Japan belonged to the Portuguese Diocese of Macau. In 1588, the diocese of Funai (Nagasaki) was founded under Portuguese protection.

In rivalry with the Jesuits, Spanish-sponsored mendicant orders entered into Japan via Manila. In addition to criticizing Jesuit activities, they actively lobbied the Pope. Their campaigns resulted in Pope Clement VIII's decree of 1600, which allowed Spanish friars to enter Japan via the Portuguese Indies, and Pope Paul V's decree of 1608, which abolished the restrictions on the route. The Portuguese accused Spanish Jesuits of working for their homeland instead of their religion. The power struggle between Jesuits and mendicant orders caused a schism within the diocese of Funai. Furthermore, mendicant orders tried in vain to establish a diocese on the Tōhoku region that was to be independent from the Portuguese one.

The Roman Catholic world order was challenged by the Netherlands and England. Its principle was repudiated by Grotius's Mare Liberum. In the early 17th century, Japan built trade relations with the Netherlands and England. Although England withdrew from the operations within ten years under James I due to a lack of profitability, the Netherlands continued to trade with Japan and became the only European country that maintained trade relations with Japan until the 19th century. As trade competitors, the Protestant countries engaged in a campaign against Catholicism, and this subsequently adversely affected shogunate policies toward the Iberian kingdoms.

Portugal's and Spain's colonial policies were also challenged by the Roman Catholic Church itself. The Vatican founded the Congregatio de Propaganda Fide in 1622 and attempted to separate the churches from the influence of the Iberian kingdoms. However, it was too late for Japan. The organization failed to establish staging points in Japan.

Propagation strategy 

The Jesuits believed that it was better to seek to influence people in power and then allow the religion to be passed downwards to the commoners later. They tried to avoid suspicion by not preaching to the commoners without permission from the local rulers to propagate Catholicism within their domains. As a result, several daimyō became Christians, soon to be followed by many of their subjects as the Dominicans and Augustinians were able to begin preaching to the commoners. After the edict banning Christianity, there were communities that kept practicing Catholicism without having any contact with the Church until missionaries were able to return much later.

When Xavier disembarked in Kagoshima, the principal chiefs of the two branches of the Shimazu family, Sanehisa and Katsuhisa, were warring for the sovereignty of their lands. Katsuhisa adopted Shimazu Takahisa who in 1542 was accepted as head of the clan having previously received the Portuguese merchants on Tanegashima Island, learning about the use of firearms. Later, he met Xavier himself at the castle of Uchiujijo and permitted the conversion of his vassals.

Having a religious background, Takahisa showed himself to be benevolent and already allowed freedom of worship but not helping the missionaries nor favoring their church. Failing to find a way to the centre of affairs, the court of the Emperor, Xavier soon tired and left to Yamaguchi thus beginning the Yamaguchi period. Xavier stayed in Yamaguchi for two months on his way to an abortive audience with the Emperor in Kyoto. Yamaguchi was already a prosperous and refined city and its leaders, the Ōuchi family, were aware that Xavier's journey to Japan had begun after the completion of his mission in India.

They took Catholicism for some sort of new sect of Buddhism and were curious to know of the priest's doctrine. Tolerant but shrewd, their eyes less on baptism than the Portuguese cargoes from Macao, they granted the Jesuit permission to preach. The uncompromising Xavier took to the streets of the city denouncing, among other things, infanticide, idolatry and homosexuality. Misunderstandings were inevitable.

Christian books were published in Japanese from the 1590s on, some with more than one thousand copies, and from 1601 a printing press was established under the supervision of Soin Goto Thomas, a citizen of Nagasaki, with thirty Japanese working full-time at the press. Liturgical calendars were also printed after 1592 until at least 1634. Christian solidarity made possible missionary mail delivery throughout the country until the end of the 1620s.

Early Christian community 

Different groups of laymen supported Christian life in the Japanese mission, e.g., dōjuku, kanbō and jihiyakusha helped the clergymen in activities like the celebration of Sunday liturgy in the absence of ordained clergy, religious education, preparation of confessions, and 
spiritual support of the sick. By the end of the 16th century kanbō and jihiyakusha had similar responsibilities and also organized funerals and baptized children with permission to baptize from Rome. The kanbō were those who had left secular life but not taken formal vows, while the jihiyakusha were married and had a profession.

These groups were fundamental to the mission, and themselves depended on both the ecclesiastical hierarchy as well as the warlords who controlled the lands where they lived. Therefore, the success of the Japanese mission cannot be explained only as the result of the action of a brilliant group of missionaries, or of the commercial and political interests of a few daimyōs and traders.

At the same time the missionaries faced the hostility of many other daimyōs. Christianity challenged Japanese civilization. A militant lay community, the main reason for missionary success in Japan, was also the main reason for the anti-Christian policy of the Tokugawa's bakufu.

Economic activities 
The Jesuits in Japan had to maintain economic self-sufficiency because they could not expect stable and sufficient payment from their patron, the King of Portugal, but the king allowed the Jesuits to engage in trade with Japan. Such economic activity can be found in the work of Francis Xavier, the pioneer of Catholic missions in Japan, who covered the cost of missionary work through merchant trading. From the 1550s to the 1570s, the Jesuits covered all necessary expenses with trade profits and bought land in India.

Their officially recognized commercial activity was a fixed-amount entry into the Portuguese silk trade between Macau and Nagasaki. They financed to a certain amount the trade association in Macau, which purchased raw silk in Canton and sold it in Nagasaki. They did not confine their commercial activity to the official silk market but expanded into unauthorized markets. For the Macau-Nagasaki trade, they dealt in silk fabrics, gold, musk and other goods including military supplies and slavery. Sometimes, they even got involved in Spanish trade, prohibited by the kings of Spain and Portugal, and antagonizing the Portuguese traders.

It was mainly procurators who brokered Portuguese trade. They resided in Macau and Nagasaki, and accepted purchase commitments by Japanese customers such as the shogunate daimyō and wealthy merchants. By brokerage, the Jesuits could expect not only rebates but also favorable treatment from the authorities. For this reason, the office of procurator became an important post amongst the Jesuits in Japan. Although trade activities by the Jesuits ate into Portuguese trade interests, procurators continued their brokerage utilizing the authority of the Catholic Church. At the same time, Portuguese merchants required the assistance of procurators who were familiar with Japanese customs, since they established no permanent trading post in Japan.  Probably the most notable procurator was João Rodrigues, who approached Toyotomi Hideyoshi and Tokugawa Ieyasu and even participated in the administration of Nagasaki.

Such commercial activities were contrary to the idea of honorable poverty that the priests held. But some Jesuits at this time placed the expansion of the society's influence before this ideal. Mendicant orders fiercely accused the Jesuits of being corrupt and even considered their activity as the primary reason for Japan's ban on Catholicism. Mendicant orders themselves were not necessarily uninvolved in commercial activities.

Military activities 

Missionaries were not reluctant to take military action if they considered it an effective way to Christianize Japan. They often associated military action against Japan with the conquest of China. They thought that well-trained Japanese soldiers who had experienced long civil wars would help their countries conquer China. For example, Alessandro Valignano said to the Philippine Governor that it was impossible to conquer Japan because the Japanese were very brave and always received military training but that Japan would benefit them when they would conquer China. Francisco Cabral also reported to the King of Spain that priests were able to send to China two or three thousand Japanese Christian soldiers who were brave and were expected to serve the king with little pay.

The Jesuits provided various kinds of support including military support to Kirishitan daimyōs when they were threatened by non-Kirishitan daimyōs. Most notable was their support of Ōmura Sumitada and Arima Harunobu, who fought against the anti-Catholic Ryuzoji clan. In the 1580s, Valignano believed in the effectiveness of military action and fortified Nagasaki and Mogi. In 1585, Gaspar Coelho asked the Spanish Philippines to send a fleet but the plan was rejected due to the shortness of its military capability.   Christians Arima Harunobu and Paulo Okamoto were named as principals in an assassination plot to murder the magistrate in charge of the Shogunate's most important port city of Nagasaki.

Early policy toward Catholicism 

When the Jesuit priest Francis Xavier arrived, Japan was experiencing a nationwide civil war. Neither the emperor nor the Ashikaga shogun could exercise power over the nation. At first, Xavier planned to gain permission for building a mission from the emperor but was disappointed with the devastation of the imperial residence. The Jesuits approached daimyōs in southwestern Japan and succeeded in converting some of these daimyōs. One reason for their conversion may have been the Portuguese trade in which the Jesuits acted as brokers. The Jesuits recognized this and approached local rulers with offers of trade and exotic gifts.

The Jesuits attempted to expand their activity to Kyoto and the surrounding regions. In 1559, Gaspar Vilela obtained permission from Ashikaga Yoshiteru to teach Christianity. This license was the same as those given to Buddhist temples, so special treatment cannot be confirmed regarding the Jesuits. On the other hand, Emperor Ōgimachi issued edicts to ban Catholicism in 1565 and 1568. The orders of the Emperor and the Shogun made little difference.

Christians refer positively to Oda Nobunaga, who died in the middle of the unification of Japan. He favored the Jesuit missionary Luís Fróis and generally tolerated Christianity. But overall, he undertook no remarkable policies toward Catholicism. Actually, Catholic power in his domain was trivial because he did not conquer western Japan, where the Jesuits were based. By 1579, at the height of missionary activity, there were about 130,000 converts.

Toyotomi Hideyoshi and the Christian daimyōs 

The situation was changed when Toyotomi Hideyoshi reunified Japan. Once he became the ruler of Japan, Hideyoshi began to pay attention to external threats, particularly the expansion of European power in East Asia.  The turning point for Catholic missions was the San Felipe incident, where in an attempt to recover his cargo, the Spanish captain of a shipwrecked trading vessel claimed that the missionaries were there to prepare Japan for conquest. These claims made Hideyoshi suspicious of the foreign religion. He attempted to curb Catholicism while maintaining good trading relations with Portugal and Spain, which might have provided military support to Dom Justo Takayama, a Christian daimyō in western Japan.  Many daimyōs converted to Christianity in order to gain more favorable access to saltpeter, used to make gunpowder. Between 1553 and 1620, eighty-six daimyōs were officially baptized, and many more were sympathetic to the Christians.

By 1587, Hideyoshi had become alarmed by reports that Christian lords oversaw forced conversions of retainers and commoners, that they had garrisoned the city of Nagasaki, that they participated in the slave trade of other Japanese and, apparently offending Hideyoshi's Buddhist sentiments, that they allowed the slaughter of horses and oxen for food. It consists of 11 articles: "No. 10. Do not sell Japanese people to the Nanban (Portuguese)." Among the contents were a ban on missionaries. The Jesuits in Nagasaki considered armed resistance, but the plans did not come to fruition. Led by Coelho, they sought help from Kirishitan daimyōs, but the daimyōs refused. Then they called for a deployment of reinforcements from their homeland and its colonies, but this plan was abolished by Valignano. Like the Kirishitan daimyōs, he realized that a military campaign against Japan's powerful ruler would bring catastrophe to Catholicism in Japan. Valignano survived the crisis by laying all the blame on Coelho, and in 1590, the Jesuits decided to stop intervening in the struggles between the daimyōs and to disarm themselves. They only gave secret shipments of food and financial aid to Kirishitan daimyōs.

However, the 1587 decree was not particularly enforced. In contrast to the Jesuits, the Dominicans, Franciscans, and Augustinians were openly preaching to the common peoples; this caused Hideyoshi to become concerned that commoners with divided loyalties might lead to dangerous rebels like the Ikkō-ikki sect of earlier years; this led to Hideyoshi putting the 26 Martyrs of Japan followers to death in 1597 on his order. After Hideyoshi died in 1598, amidst the chaos of succession there was less of a focus on persecuting Christians.

Expansion 

By the end of the 16th century, the Japanese mission had become the largest overseas Christian community that was not under the rule of a European power. Its uniqueness was emphasized by Alessandro Valignano since 1582, who promoted a deeper accommodation of Japanese culture. Japan was then the sole overseas country in which all members of those confraternities were locals, as was the case with Christian missions in Mexico, Peru, Brazil, the Philippines, or India, in spite of the presence of a colonial elite.

Most Japanese Christians lived in Kyushu, but Christianization was not a regional phenomenon and had a national impact. By the end of the 16th century it was possible to find baptized people in virtually every province of Japan, many of them organized in communities. On the eve of the Sekigahara battle, fifteen daimyōs were baptized, and their domains stretched from Hyūga in Southeast Kyushu to Dewa in North Honshū. Hundreds of churches had been built throughout Japan.

Accepted on a national scale, Christianity was also successful among different social groups from the poor to the rich, peasants, traders, sailors, warriors, or courtesans.  Most of the daily activities of the Church were done by Japanese from the beginning, giving the Japanese Church a native face, and this was one of the reasons for its success.  By 1590, there were seventy native brothers in Japan, fully one half of Jesuits in Japan, and fifteen percent of all Jesuits who were working in Asia.

In June 1592, Hideyoshi invaded Korea; among his leading generals was Christian daimyō Konishi Yukinaga. The actions of his forces in the massacre and enslavement of many of the Korean people were indistinguishable from the non-Christian Japanese forces that participated in the invasion. After Konishi's loss in the battle of Sekigahara, Konishi would base his refusal to commit seppuku on his Christian beliefs; instead of taking his own life, he chose capture and execution.

The 1592 war between Japan and Korea also provided Westerners with a rare opportunity to visit Korea. Under orders of Gomaz, the Jesuit Gregorious de Cespedes arrived in Korea with a Japanese monk for the purpose of administering to the Japanese troops. He stayed there for approximately 18 months, until April or May 1595, thus being on record as the first European missionary to visit the Korean peninsula, but was unable to make any inroads. The Annual Letters of Japan made a substantial contribution to the introduction of Korea to Europe, Francis Xavier having crossed paths with Korean envoys dispatched to Japan during 1550 and 1551.

The Japanese missions were economically self-sufficient. Nagasaki's misericórdias became rich and powerful institutions which every year received large donations. The brotherhood grew in numbers to over 100 by 1585 and 150 in 1609. Controlled by the elite of Nagasaki, and not by Portuguese, it had two hospitals (one for lepers) and a large church.  By 1606, there already existed a feminine religious order called Miyako no Bikuni ("nuns of Kyoto") which accepted Korean converts such as Marina Pak, baptized in Nagasaki. Nagasaki was called "the Rome of Japan" and most of its inhabitants were Christians. By 1611, it had ten churches and was divided into eight parishes including a specifically Korean order.

Tokugawa response 

Following Toyotomi Hideyoshi's death in 1598, Tokugawa Ieyasu assumed power over Japan in 1600. Like Toyotomi Hideyoshi, he disliked Christian activities in Japan but gave priority to trade with Portugal and Spain. He secured Portuguese trade in 1600. He negotiated with Manila to establish trade with the Philippines. The trade promotion made his policies toward Catholicism inconsistent. At the same time, in an attempt to wrest control of the Japan trade from the Catholic countries, Dutch and British traders advised the Shogunate that Spain did indeed have territorial ambitions, and that Catholicism was Spain's principal means. The Dutch and British promised, in distinction, that they would limit themselves to trading and would not conduct missionary activities in Japan.

It seems that the Jesuits realized that the Tokugawa shogunate was much stronger and more stable than Toyotomi Hideyoshi's administration, yet the mendicant orders discussed military options relatively openly. In 1615, a Franciscan emissary of the Viceroy of New Spain asked the shogun for land to build a Spanish fortress and this deepened Japan's suspicion against Catholicism and the Iberian colonial powers behind it. The Jesuits and the Mendicant Orders kept a lasting rivalry over the Japanese mission and attached to different imperial strategies.

Early persecution 
The Tokugawa shogunate finally decided to ban Catholicism. The statement on the "Expulsion of all missionaries from Japan", drafted by Zen monk Konchiin Suden (1563–1633) and issued in 1614 under the name of second shogun Hidetada (ruled 1605–1623), was considered the first official statement of a comprehensive control of Kirishitan. It claimed that the Christians were bringing disorder to Japanese society and that their followers "contravene governmental regulations, traduce Shinto, calumniate the True Law, destroy regulations, and corrupt goodness". It was fully implemented and canonized as one of the fundamental Tokugawan laws.  In the same year, the bakufu required all subjects of all domains to register at their local Buddhist temple; this would become an annual requirement in 1666, cementing the Buddhist temples as an instrument of state control.

The immediate cause of the prohibition was the Okamoto Daihachi incident, a case of fraud involving Ieyasu's Catholic vavasor, but there were also other reasons behind it. The shogunate was concerned about a possible invasion by the Iberian colonial powers, which had previously occurred in the New World and the Philippines. Domestically, the ban was closely related to measures against the Toyotomi clan. 
The Buddhist ecclesiastical establishment was made responsible for verifying that a person was not a Christian through what became known as the "temple guarantee system" (terauke seido). By the 1630s, people were being required to produce a certificate of affiliation with a Buddhist temple as proof of religious orthodoxy, social acceptability and loyalty to the regime.

In the mid-17th century, the shogunate demanded the expulsion of all European missionaries and the execution of all converts. This marked the end of open Christianity in Japan. The bakufu erected bulletin boards nationwide at crossroads and bridges; among the many proscriptions listed on these boards were strict warnings against Christianity.

The systematic persecution beginning in 1614 faced stiff resistance from Christians, despite the departure of more than half the clergy. Once again, the main reason for this resistance was not the presence of a few priests but rather the self-organization of many communities. Forced to secrecy, and having a small number of clergymen working underground, the Japanese Church was able to recruit leadership from among lay members. Japanese children caused admiration among the Portuguese and seem to have participated actively in the resistance. Nagasaki remained a Christian city in the first decades of the 17th century and during the general persecutions other confraternities were founded in Shimabara, Kinai and Franciscans in Edo.

The number of active Christians is estimated to have been around 200,000 in 1582. There were likely around 1,000 known martyrs during the missionary period. In contrast, Christians attach a great importance to martyrdom and persecution, noting that countless more people were dispossessed of their land and property leading to their subsequent death in poverty.

The Japanese government used fumi-e to reveal practicing Catholics and sympathizers. Fumi-e were pictures of the Virgin Mary or Christ. People reluctant to step on the pictures were identified as Christian and taken to Nagasaki. If they refused to renounce their religion, they were tortured; those who still refused were executed.

Later persecution 
The Shimabara Rebellion, led by a young Christian man named Amakusa Shirō Tokisada, took place against the shogunate in 1637. The rebellion broke out over economic desperation and government oppression but later assumed a religious tone.  About 27,000 people joined the uprising, but it was crushed by the shogunate after a sustained campaign. The reigning shogun, Tokugawa Iemitsu, who had issued the Sakoku Edict, restricting trade and effectively isolating Japan, two years earlier, came down hard on the Christians. Many Japanese were deported to Macau or to Spanish Philippines. Many Macanese and Japanese-Filipino Mestizos are the mixed-race descendants of the deported Japanese Catholics. About 400 were officially deported by the government to Macau and Manila, but thousands of Japanese were pressured into moving voluntarily. About 10,000 Macanese and 3,000 Japanese were moved to Manila.

The Catholic remnant in Japan were driven underground, and its members became known as the "Hidden Christians". Some priests remained in Japan illegally, including 18 Jesuits, seven Franciscans, seven Dominicans, one Augustinian, five seculars and an unknown number of Jesuit irmao and dojuku. Since this time corresponds to the Thirty Years' War between Catholics and Protestants in Germany, it is possible that the checking of Catholic power in Europe reduced the flow of funds to the Catholic missions in Japan, which could be why they failed at this time and not before. During the Edo period, the Kakure Kirishitan kept their faith. Biblical phrases or prayers were transferred orally from parent to child, and secret posts (mizukata) were assigned in their underground community to baptize their children, all while regional governments continuously operated fumi-e to expose Christians.

Rediscovery and return 

Japan was forced to open to foreign interaction by Matthew Perry in 1853. It became possible for foreigners to live in Japan with the Harris Treaty in 1858. Many Christian clergymen were sent from Catholic, Protestant and Orthodox churches, though proselytizing was still banned. In 1865, some of the Japanese who lived in Urakami village near Nagasaki visited the new Ōura Church which had been built by the Paris Foreign Missions Society (Missions étrangères de Paris) barely a month before. A female member of the group spoke to a French priest, Bernard Petitjean, and confessed that their families had kept the Kirishitan faith. Those Kirishitan wanted to see the statue of St. Mary with their own eyes, and to confirm that the priest was single and truly came from the pope in Rome. After this interview, many Kirishitan thronged toward Petitjean. He investigated their underground organizations and discovered that they had kept the rite of baptism and the liturgical years without European priests for nearly 250 years. Petitjean's report surprised the Christian world; Pope Pius IX called it a miracle.

The Edo Shogunate's edicts banning Christianity were still on the books, however, and thus the religion continued to be persecuted up to 1867, the last year of its rule. Robert Bruce Van Valkenburgh, the American minister-resident in Japan, privately complained of this persecution to the Nagasaki magistrates, though little action was taken to stop it. The succeeding government under Emperor Meiji, who took over from the Tokugawa shogunate in 1868, initially continued in this vein and several thousand people were exiled (Urakami Yoban Kuzure). After Europe and the U.S. began to vocally criticize the persecution, the Japanese government realized that it needed to lift the ban in order to attain its interests. In 1873 the ban was lifted. Numerous exiles returned and began construction of the Urakami Cathedral, which was completed in 1895.

It was later revealed that tens of thousands of Kirishitan still survived in some regions near Nagasaki. Some officially returned to the Roman Catholic Church. Others remained apart from the Catholic Church and have stayed as Kakure Kirishitan, retaining their own traditional beliefs and their descendants asserting that they keep their ancestors' religion. However, it became difficult for them to keep their community and rituals, so they have converted to Buddhism or Shinto eventually. When John Paul II visited Nagasaki in 1981, he baptized some young people from Kakure Kirishitan families, a rare occurrence.

Christian view of Kirishitan history 
Those who participated in the Shimabara Revolt are not considered to be martyrs by the Catholic Church since they took up arms for materialistic reasons.

Drawn from the oral histories of Japanese Catholic communities, Shūsaku Endō's novel "Silence" provides detailed accounts of the persecution of Christian communities and the suppression of the Church.

Kirishitan daimyōs 
 Ōmura Sumitada, first Christian feudal lord (1533–1587)
 Ōmura Yoshiaki (1568–1615)
 Arima Harunobu, Christian name Dom Protasio, Lord of Shimabara (1567–1612)
 Arima Naozumi (1586–1641)
 Kuroda Yoshitaka, Dom Simeao, a chief strategist of Hideyoshi's (1546–1604)
 Kuroda Nagamasa (黒田 長政, December 3, 1568 – August 29, 1623) 
 Konishi Yukinaga, Dom Agostinho, chief member of Hideyoshi's field staff (1555–1600)
 Dom Justo Takayama Ukon, daimyō of Akashi, chosen life of exile in Manila, Philippines (1552–1615)
 Gamō Ujisato (1556–1595)
 Ōtomo Sōrin (大友 宗麟) (1530–1587), also known as Fujiwara no Yoshishige (藤原 義鎮) and Ōtomo Yoshishige (大友 義鎮). Christian name Dom Francisco; referred to as the "King of Bungo" by the Jesuits
 Ōtomo Yoshimune (大友 義統), Constantino
 Ōtomo Chikaie (大友 親家), Dom Sebastin (1561–1641)
 Ōtomo Chikamori (大友 親盛）
 Oda Hidenobu, Christian name Peter (1580–1605)
 Tsugaru Nobuhira (1586–1631)

Kirishitans 
 Twenty-six Martyrs of Japan
 Paulo Miki (1563–1596)
 Amano Motonobu
 Petro Kasui Kibe (1587–1639)
 Itō Mancio (伊東マンショ Itō Mansho),　伊東祐益 (1570–1612)
 Julião Nakaura (中浦ジュリアン Nakaura Jurian)
 Martinão Hara (原マルチノ Hara Maruchino)
 Miguel Chijiwa (千々石ミゲル Chijiwa Migeru)
 Akashi Takenori
 Leonardo Kimura (1575-1619)
 Hasekura Tsunenaga (支倉常長)
 Murayama Tōan "Antonio" (村山等安) (d.1619)
 Naitō Joan
 Gohime ''Monica'' (Bizen no Gomoji), Hideyoshi's daughter (1574–1634)
 Hosokawa Gracia
 Kyōgoku Maria
 Amakusa Shirō
 Julia Ota
 Naitō Julia

In popular culture 
 Shūsaku Endō's novel Silence and its two film adaptations in 1971 and 2016 deal with the 17th century suppression of the last known Japanese Christian communities.

See also 

 Roman Catholicism in Japan
 Martyrs of Japan
 Nanban trade period
 Nippo Jisho
 Japanese words of Portuguese origin
 Suwa Shrine (Nagasaki)
 List of Westerners who visited Japan before 1868
 Folk Catholicism
Shogun Novel

Citations

References

Sources

Further reading 

 
 .
 .
 
 .
 .
 .
 
 .
 
 .
 .
 
 
 
 
 .
 .
 .

External links 
 The Christian Century in Japan, by Charles Boxer

 .
 .

History of Christianity in Japan
16th century in Japan
17th century in Japan
Japanese historical terms
Catholic Church in Japan
Crypto-Christianity
16th-century Catholicism
17th-century Catholicism